NA-145 (Okara-III) was a constituency for the National Assembly of Pakistan comprising mainly Renala Khurd Tehsil. After the 2018 delimitations it was abolished, and its areas were included in the constituencies of NA-141 (Okara-I) and NA-143 (Okara-III).

Election 2002 

General elections were held on 10 Oct 2002. Syed Gulzair Sabtain Shah of PML-Q won by 39,391  votes.

Election 2008 

General elections were held on 18 Feb 2008. Syed Sumsam Ali S. Bukhari of PPP won by 64,607  votes.

Election 2013 

General elections were held on 11 May 2013. Syed Muhammad Ashiq Hussain Shah of PML-N won by 89,025 votes and became the  member of National Assembly.

References

External links 
 Election result's official website

NA-145